The 2014–15 season of the Niedersachsenliga, the highest association football league in the German state of Lower Saxony, was the seventh season of the league at tier five (V) of the German football league system.

2014–15 season

Standings										
The 2014–15 season saw four new clubs in the league, Eintracht Northeim, SC Spelle-Venhaus, Arminia Hannover and Teutonia Uelzen, all four promoted from the Landesligas, while no club had been relegated from the Regionalliga Nord.

Results

Top goalscorers
The top goal scorers for the season:

Promotion play-off
The champions of the Bremen-Liga, Oberliga Hamburg and the Schleswig-Holstein-Liga as well as the runners-up from the Niedersachsenliga entered a play-off for two more spots in the Regionalliga Nord. Eight clubs from these four leagues applied for a Regionalliga licence. As the only club from Hamburg to apply for a licence, SC Victoria Hamburg, later declined participation only three clubs take part in the promotion round, Bremer SV, TSV Schilksee and VfV 06 Hildesheim, with the latter two promoted:

References

External links 
 Niedersachsenliga on Fupa.net 

Niedersachsenliga
Niedersachsenliga